Bradwell Waterside is a small hamlet in Essex, England. The hamlet is in the district of Maldon and the parliamentary constituency of Maldon & East Chelmsford. The population of the hamlet is included in the civil parish of Bradwell-on-Sea.

It has a marina and is about a mile north-northwest of Bradwell-on-Sea on the Blackwater Estuary on the northern edge of the Dengie peninsula.

See also
Pewet Island

Maldon District
Hamlets in Essex